The East African Railways and Harbours Corporation (EAR&H) is a defunct company that operated railways and harbours in East Africa from 1948 to 1977. It was formed in 1948 for the new East African High Commission by merging the Kenya and Uganda Railways and Harbours with the Tanganyika Railway of the Tanganyika Territory. As well as running railways and harbours in the three territories it ran inland shipping services on Lake Victoria, Lake Kyoga, Lake Albert, the Victoria Nile and the Albert Nile.

Railways

The Malayan Railway sold the EAR&H eight metre gauge USATC S118 Class steam locomotives in 1948, and another eight in 1949. The EAR&H converted them to oil burners and numbered them 2701–2716, making them the 27 class and allocating them to its Tabora Depot on its Tanganyika section. They entered service in 1949 and 1950, working the lines to Mwanza, Kigoma and Mpanda where their light axle loading was an advantage and their high firebox enabled them to run through seasonal flooding on the Kigoma and Mpanda branches. EAR&H built further S118 from spare parts in 1953 and numbered it 2717. The EAR&H withdrew them from service in about 1965, and they were moved to Dar es Salaam for scrapping in 1966.

In 1955 and 1956, the EAR&H introduced new and much more powerful steam locomotives for its Kenya and Uganda network: the 59 class Garratts. These were the mainstay of the section's heaviest traffic between Mombasa and Nairobi until they started to be withdrawn from service between 1973 and 1980.

The EAR&H extended the Uganda Railway from Kampala to the copper mines at Kasese in 1956. In 1962, it completed the northern Uganda railway from Soroti to Pakwach and from there to Arua in 1964, thus superseding the Victoria Nile steamer service.

International ferries
Proposed ferries from East Africa Harbour (E.A.H):

 Lagos
 Cairo
 Canada (Int. Oveaseas)

Inland ferries

In 1961, the EAR&H introduced the new Lake Victoria ferry RMS Victoria. This faster vessel doubled the speed of the circular service around the lake, allowing EAR&H to increase sailings from once to twice a week. Elizabeth II designated her a Royal Mail Ship, making it the only EAR&H ship to receive this distinction.

In 1967, the EAR&H made harbour improvements at Kisumu on the Kenyan shore of Lake Victoria by scuttling the disused ferry  to form a breakwater.

Dissolution
In 1977, the High Commission's successor, the East African Community, was dissolved and EAR&H's rail network was broken up into three national railways: Kenya Railways Corporation, Tanzania Railways Corporation and Uganda Railways Corporation.

In Culture
Kenyan-born singer Roger Whittaker wrote and recorded the song The Good Old EAR&H in about 1982, after a return visit to Kenya.

See also
Central Line (Tanzania)
Rift Valley Railways Consortium
Uganda Railway
East African Railway Master Plan

References

Further reading

External links

Malcolm McCrow's EAR web site
Flags of the EAR&HC
Archive of East African Railways and Harbours staff magazines

 
Railway companies of Kenya
Rail transport in East Africa
Water transport in Africa
Ports and harbours in Africa
Railway companies of Uganda
Railway companies of Tanzania
1948 establishments in Africa
1977 disestablishments in Africa